10th Independent Mixed Regiment was a regiment of the Imperial Japanese Army that has association with a number of U.S. National Register of Historic Places-listed places in Guam.

Fortifications associated include:
Garapan Mount Pillbox, address restricted, Talofofo, GU
Ilik River Fortification II, shore of Ylig Point, Yona, GU
Malessu' Pillbox, Talona Beach on Cocos Lagoon, Merizo, GU
Mana Pillbox, south shore of As Anite Cove, Talofofo, GU
Matala' Pillbox, address restricted, Talofofo, GU
Talofofo-Talu'fofo' Pillbox, south shore of Ylig river, Talofofo, GU
Tokcha' Pillbox, Toghca Point shoreline, Ipan, GU

See also
Tomhum Pillbox II, west shore of Naton Beach on Tumon Bay, Tumon, GU, associated with the 48th Independent Mixed Brigade

References

Mixed regiments of Japan